Roswell is a city in, and the seat of, Chaves County in the U.S. state of New Mexico. Chaves County forms the entirety of the Roswell micropolitan area. As of the 2020 census it had a population of 48,422, making it the fifth-largest city in New Mexico. It is home of the New Mexico Military Institute (NMMI), founded in 1891. The city is also the location of an Eastern New Mexico University campus. Bitter Lake National Wildlife Refuge is located a few miles northeast of the city on the Pecos River.

The investigation and debris recovery was handled by the local Roswell Army Air Field. On the 50th anniversary of the Roswell incident, an annual UFO Festival was started. 

In the 1930s, Roswell was a site for much of Robert H. Goddard's early rocketry work. The Roswell Museum and Art Center maintains an exhibit that includes a recreation of Goddard's rocket engine development workshop, and Goddard High School is named after him. 

Roswell's tourism industry is based on aerospace engineering and ufology museums and businesses, as well as alien-themed and spacecraft-themed iconography. The city also relies on New Mexico and Americana related tourism. New Mexican cuisine restaurants, such as Martin's Capitol Café, are located near downtown on Main Street, near the International UFO Museum and Research Center. Local American folk and New Mexico music performances occur near Pioneer Plaza and in parks around the city. It is a center for acequia-like irrigated farming, dairying, and ranching; it is also the location of several manufacturing, distribution, and petroleum related facilities. This regional pride has resulted in Roswell receiving the All-America City Award multiple times, in 1978–79 and 2002.

Roswell has a history of minor league baseball.

History

It was called Missouri Plaza. It also had many Hispanic people from Lincoln, New Mexico. At the time, it was the largest ranch in the United States.

Van C. Smith, a businessman from Omaha, Nebraska, and his partner, Aaron Wilburn, constructed two adobe buildings in 1869 that began what is now Roswell. The two buildings became the settlement's general store, post office, and sleeping quarters for paying guests. In 1871, Smith filed a claim with the federal government for the land around the buildings, and on August 20, 1873, he became the town's first postmaster. Smith was the son of Roswell Smith, a prominent lawyer in Lafayette, Indiana, and Annie Ellsworth, daughter of U.S. Patent Commissioner Henry Leavitt Ellsworth. He called the town Roswell, after his father's first name.

In 1877, Captain Joseph Calloway Lea and his family bought out Smith and Wilburn's claim and became the owners of most of the land of Roswell and the area surrounding it. The town was relatively quiet during the Lincoln County War (1877–1879). A major aquifer was discovered when merchant Nathan Jaffa had a well drilled in his back yard on Richardson Avenue in 1890, resulting in the area's first major growth and development spurt. The growth continued when the Pecos Valley Railroad arrived in 1892.

During World War II, a prisoner-of-war camp was located in nearby Orchard Park. The German prisoners of war were used to do major infrastructure work in Roswell, such as paving the banks of the North Spring River. Some POWs used rocks of different sizes to create the outline of an iron cross among the stones covering the north bank. Later, the iron cross was covered with a thin layer of concrete. In the 1980s, a crew cleaning the river bed cleared off the concrete and revealed the outline once more. The small park just south of the cross was then known as Iron Cross Park. On November 11, 1996, the park was renamed POW/MIA Park. The park displays a piece of the Berlin Wall, presented to the city of Roswell by the German Air Force.

Roswell was a location of military importance from 1941 to 1967. In 1967, the Walker Air Force Base was decommissioned. After the closure of the base, Roswell capitalized on its pleasant climate and reinvented itself as a retirement community.

Roswell has benefited from interest in the alleged UFO incident of 1947. It was the report of an object that crashed in the general vicinity in June or July 1947, allegedly an extraterrestrial spacecraft and its alien occupants. Since the late 1970s, the incident has been the subject of intense controversy and of a conspiracy theory regarding a classified program named "Project Mogul". Many UFO proponents maintain that an alien craft was found and its occupants were captured, and that the military then engaged in a cover-up. In recent times, the business community has deliberately sought out tourists interested in UFOs, science fiction, and aliens.

Roswell hosted the record-breaking skydive by Felix Baumgartner on October 14, 2012.

Geography
U.S. Routes 70, 285 and 380 intersect in the city.

Climate
Roswell is located in both the High Plains and the Chihuahuan Desert and has four very distinct seasons, giving it a cold semi-arid climate (BSk) according to the Köppen climate classification. Winters are cool, but usually sunny, and snowfall can occur. Spring is mild and usually warm, but can still be cold on occasion. Summers are very hot (as is common with the High Plains of New Mexico and Colorado) and averages around 30 days per year when the temperature rises above , which can be unpleasant. The North American monsoon occurs during the summer, and can bring torrential downpours, severe thunderstorms (with high winds and hail) and sometimes even tornadoes. The rain can provide a cooling relief from the scorching great plains heat. Fall is usually warm and pleasant, but can be cold late in the season. Snow is possible in October and November.

Demographics

As of the 2010 census, 48,366 people, in 17,506 households, resided in the city. The population density was 1,619.9 people per square mile (604.3/km). The racial makeup of the city was 58.3% Hispanics or Latinos, 36.5% White, 2.0% Native American, 1.8% African American, 1.3% Asian, and 2.3% from two or more races.

In the city, the population was distributed as 26.5% under 18, while 15.6% were 65 years of age or older.

The median income for a household in the city was $43,372, and per capita income was $22,119 (2015–2019 in 2019 dollars). In 2019, 19.7% of the population were living below the poverty line.

Education

Public schools
 Roswell Independent School District
Goddard High School
Roswell High School
 Mountain View Middle School
 Mesa Middle School
 Sierra Middle School
 Berrendo Middle School

Private schools
 All Saints Catholic School, a pre-K through eighth-grade Catholic school
 Gateway Christian School, a pre-K through high school parochial school
 Immanuel Lutheran School, a Junior Kindergarten through 9th grade classical school
 Saint Andrews Catholic School, a K-6 Catholic School

Colleges and universities
 Eastern New Mexico University-Roswell is a branch of Eastern New Mexico University (headquartered in Portales). The Roswell campus offers several certificate and associate programs. Also, bachelor's and master's programs are available via ENMU's Instructional Television System.
 New Mexico Military Institute offers four-year high school and two-year associate college-degree programs.

Professional education
 International Law Enforcement Academy, also known as ILEA-Roswell, is an academy run by the United States federal government to train law enforcement officers from around the world in the latest law enforcement techniques.

Sports
The Roswell Invaders play in the Pecos League of professional baseball clubs. The Invaders wear lime-green uniforms to represent the city's extraterrestrial connections. Home games are played at the Joe Bauman Ballpark.

Previously, Roswell was home to the Roswell Giants (1923), Roswell Sunshiners (1937), Roswell Rockets (1949–1956), and Roswell Pirates (1959), who played in the Panhandle-Pecos Valley League (1923), West Texas-New Mexico League (1937), Longhorn League (1949–1955), Southwestern League (1956), and Sophomore League (1959).

Joe Bauman hit a minor-league record 72 home runs for the 1954 Roswell Rockets. Overall, Bauman hit .400 with 72 home runs and 224 RBI, 150 walks and 188 runs in the 1954 season. Baseball Hall of Fame inductee Willie Stargell played for the 1959 Roswell Pirates. Roswell was an affiliate of the Pittsburgh Pirates in 1959.

Transportation

Airport
 Roswell Air Center is served by American Airlines via its American Eagle regional airline affiliate. Its former name, Roswell International Air Center, still appears in some references and on some local signage.

Bus routes
 Served by Pecos Trails Transit

Major highways
 U.S. Route 70
 U.S. Route 285
 U.S. Route 380

Railroads
BNSF Railway provides freight services. Currently there is no intercity passenger service.

Local industry

Roswell is home to Leprino Foods, one of the world's largest mozzarella factories. It is also the location of the former Transportation Manufacturing Corporation factory, best known for producing various iterations of the RTS city bus since 1987. The factory was operated by Nova Bus from 1994 to 2003 and subsequently by Millennium Transit Services.

Cultural attractions 
Roswell's tourism industry is based on aerospace engineering and ufology museums and businesses, as well as alien-themed and spacecraft-themed iconography. A yearly UFO festival has been held since 1995.

The Roswell Museum maintains an exhibit that includes a recreation of Goddard's rocket engine development workshop, as well as a planetarium and a collection of fine art. The Roswell Artist-in-Residence (RAIR) program has an associated museum, the Anderson Museum of Contemporary Art which features more than 200 artists in the collection.

Notable residents 

Robert O. Anderson, businessman and philanthropist
Bobby Baldock, U.S. federal appellate judge (Tenth Circuit Court of Appeals)
Tom Brookshier, professional football player and sportscaster, was born in Roswell
John Chisum, pioneer, landowner, rancher
Louise Holland Coe, first woman elected to the New Mexico Senate, first woman to run for U.S. Congress, 1894–1985
Max Coll, 15-term New Mexico House Representative (1966–1970, 1980–2004), grandson of James F. Hinkle
Ray Crawford, combat pilot and auto racer, born in Roswell
John Denver, singer and actor, born in Roswell
Sam Donaldson, TV journalist, attended NMMI
Pat Garrett, sheriff, killer of Billy the Kid
Robert H. Goddard, rocket pioneer
Susan Graham, opera singer
J.J. Hagerman, businessman and railroad developer
James F. Hinkle, Mayor of Roswell (1904–06), New Mexico State Senator (1912–1916), Governor of New Mexico (1923–25)
Nancy Lopez, LPGA Hall of Fame golfer
Jody McCrea, actor, retired in Roswell
Demi Moore, actress, born in Roswell
Sergio de la Peña, United States Army colonel, political candidate, and former Pentagon official
Gerina Piller, professional golfer
Priscilla Presley, actress and businesswoman, lived in Roswell when stepfather was transferred to Walker Air Force Base
Clinton A. Puckett, 6th Sergeant Major of the Marine Corps, Navy Cross recipient, raised in Roswell
James P. Riseley, Lieutenant General, USMC, retired in Roswell
Roy Rogers, cowboy actor and singer, under his birth name (Leonard Slye) in early 1930s
Mike E. Smith, Hall of Fame jockey, born in Roswell
Austin St. John, first Red Power Ranger, born in Roswell
Roger Staubach, quarterback, Pro Football Hall of Famer, attended NMMI

See also
 Llano Estacado
 Roswell (TV series)

References

Notes

Citations 

City Map, Roswell, New Mexico. Roswell: Roswell Printing, 1976.

External links

City of Roswell official website
Roswell Chamber of Commerce
Forbes article on Roswell

 
Populated places established in 1869
Cities in New Mexico
Roswell incident
Cities in Chaves County, New Mexico
County seats in New Mexico
Micropolitan areas of New Mexico
1869 establishments in New Mexico Territory
UFO culture in the United States